Lundmark is a Swedish surname. Notable people with the surname include:

 Anne Lundmark (born 1946), Swedish orienteering competitor
 Charles Lundmark (1927–1999), American sprint canoeist 
 Curt Lundmark (born 1944), Swedish ice hockey coach
 Jamie Lundmark (born 1981), Canadian ice hockey player
 Karl-Gösta Lundmark (1919–1995), Swedish Army lieutenant general
 Kenneth Lundmark (born 1946), Swedish high jumper
 Knut Lundmark (1889–1958), Swedish astronomer
 Pekka Lundmark (born 1963), Finnish business executive and CEO of Nokia

See also
 Lundmark (crater), a lunar crater
 Thompson-Lundmark Mine, a gold mine near Yellowknife, Northwest Territories
 Wolf-Lundmark-Melotte, an irregular galaxy located on the outer edges of the local group

Swedish-language surnames